To "agree to disagree" is to resolve a conflict (usually a debate or quarrel) in a manner whereby all parties tolerate accept the opposing positions. It generally occurs when all sides recognize that further conflict would be unnecessary, ineffective or otherwise undesirable. They may also remain on amicable terms while continuing to disagree about the unresolved issues.

Origin 

The phrase "agree to disagree" appeared in print in its modern meaning in 1770 when, at the death of George Whitefield, John Wesley wrote a memorial sermon which acknowledged but downplayed the two men's doctrinal differences:

Wesley enclosed the phrase in quotation marks, and in a subsequent letter to his brother Charles, attributed it to Whitefield (presumably George Whitefield): "If you agree with me, well: if not, we can, as Mr. Whitefield used to say, agree to disagree." Whitefield had used it in a letter as early as June 29, 1750.

The phrase is most aptly applied to those things of "a less essential nature" since an “agreement” to disagree cannot readily by found with regard to those issues of mutually recognized importance; in such an instance, the phrase "agree that we disagree" is more diplomatically and linguistically appropriate.

Though Whitefield and Wesley appear to have popularized the expression in its usual meaning, it had appeared in print much earlier (1608) in a work by James Anderton, writing under the name of John Brereley, Priest. His usage lacks the later implication of tolerance of differing beliefs, though.

And as our learned adversaries do thus agree to disagree in their owne translations, mutually condemning (as before) each other... (The Protestants Apologie for the Roman Church Deuided into three seuerall Tractes)

The phrase "agree to differ" — which does express the modern idea of "agree to disagree" — appeared in the early part of the 18th century in a sermon by John Piggott:  "And now why should we not agree to differ, without either enmity or scorn?" (Sermon on Union and Peace, preach'd to several Congregations, April 17, 1704). It expresses a similar idea without the play on words.

Also related in meaning is the modern usage of the Latin phrase modus vivendi (lit. 'mode of living'),  normally reserved for informal and temporary arrangements in political affairs.

Game theory

Game theorist and mathematician Robert Aumann argues that two people with common prior probability cannot "agree to disagree" on posterior probabilities (on predicting the likelihood of outcomes, the theorem makes no statement on preference or value judgement regarding outcomes).

Economist Frank J. Fabozzi argues that it is not rational for investors to agree to disagree; they must work toward consensus even if they have different information. For financial investments, Fabozzi posits that investors' overconfidence in their abilities (irrationality) can lead to "agreeing to disagree" if the investor thinks they are smarter than the market.

See also

 I'm entitled to my opiniona logical fallacy sometimes presented as "Let's agree to disagree"

References 

English phrases